The 2009 UEFA European Under-17 Championship was the eighth edition of UEFA's European Under-17 Football Championship since it was renamed from the original under-16 event, in 2001. Germany hosted the championship, during 6 to 18 May 2009, in thirteen venues, and the final took place at the Stadion Magdeburg, in Magdeburg. 
Spain was the current title holder, having successfully defended its 2007 title.
The top 6 teams qualified for the 2009 FIFA U-17 World Cup.

Qualification 
The final tournament of the 2009 UEFA European Under-17 Championship was preceded by two qualification stages: a qualifying round and an Elite round. During these rounds, 52 national teams competed to determine the seven teams to join the already qualified host nation Germany.

Participants 
 
 
 
 
 
 
 
  (as hosts)

Squads

Group stage

Group A

Group B

Knockout stage

Semi-finals

Final

Team of the Tournament

Countries to participate in 2009 FIFA U-17 World Cup

References 

UEFA.com
RSSSF.com

 
2009
2008–09 in European football
Under
2009
May 2009 sports events in Europe
2009 in youth association football